Saravan is the title of the head of Brahui and Baloch tribes in Balochistan, Pakistan.

See also
 Saravan

Titles in Pakistan
Balochistan